Faith Lutheran Church may refer to:

 Faith Lutheran Church (Junction City, Oregon)
 Faith Lutheran Church (Quincy, Massachusetts)